Amorós is a locality belonging to the municipality of Sant Guim de Freixenet, in the Province of Lleida, Catalonia, Spain. As of 2020, it has a population of 12. A standalone municipality in the past, it was absorbed by the municipality of Sant Guim de Freixenet in between 1842 and 1857. The Madoz dictionary described its location as lying "on a plain with free ventilation and a healthy climate".

Geography 
Amorós is located 86km east of Lleida.

References

Populated places in the Province of Lleida
Former municipalities in Spain